is the name given to the central avenue leading to the Imperial Palace from the south in Japanese capitals. Traditionally the Imperial palace complex faces south, whilst Suzaku Avenue leads directly away from the main gate. Cities were often based on a traditional Chinese grid pattern. Suzaku Avenue was typically the central road within the city grid, and as a result, the widest. Fujiwara-kyō, Heijō-kyō, and Heian-kyō had their own Suzaku Avenue.

The word "Suzaku" refers to the Guardian God of the South, who was said to appear in the form of a bird.

Heian-kyō
In Heian-kyō, present-day Kyoto, the Rajōmon (Rajōmon, Raseimon) was at the southern end of Suzaku Avenue, flanked on the east by the temple of Tō-ji, and on the west by the temple of Sai-ji, whilst at the northern end there was the main gate Suzakumon of Heian Palace. Of these, only Tō-ji remains.

Over time Suzaku Avenue stopped being the central street, due to the gradual abandonment of the west of the city. Eventually the road served as the western boundary of the town, until the Meiji period. Presently it is still a major street, called , and once served as a route for the city's tramline.

Fujiwara-kyō

Heijō-kyō

Streets in Kyoto
Historic Sites of Japan